Per-Kristian Foss  (born 19 July 1950 in Oslo) is a Norwegian politician for the Conservative Party and from 2014 to 2021 the Auditor General of Norway.

He was elected to the Norwegian Parliament from Oslo in 1981, and was re-elected on six occasions. He had previously served as a deputy representative during the term 1977–1981.

From 2001 to 2005, when the second cabinet Bondevik held office, Foss was Minister of Finance. He also acted as Prime Minister very briefly in 2002. During this period his seat in parliament was taken by Ine Eriksen Søreide. Foss has received much attention for being the first openly gay minister in a Norwegian government and lives in registered partnership with Jan Erik Knarbakk. He was the first openly homosexual national leader.

On the local level Foss was a deputy member of Oslo city council from 1971 to 1975.

From 1973 to 1977 he was the leader of the Young Conservatives (Unge Høyre), the youth wing of the Conservative Party. Per Kristian Foss was mentioned as a possible new leader for the Conservative Party after Jan Petersen resigned in 2004, but he declined to run and instead supported Erna Solberg. After Høyre struggled in elections and polls during the first years of Erna Solberg's leadership he was also mentioned as a possible new leader, but he never challenged Solberg for the leadership position. At present Foss is deputy chairman of the Conservative Party and member of the party's central board.

Foss has a cand.mag. degree in political science, public law and criminology from the University of Oslo (1977) and partial graduate studies in political science.

References

External links

1950 births
Living people
Conservative Party (Norway) politicians
Gay politicians
Ministers of Finance of Norway
Norwegian LGBT politicians
Members of the Storting
Politicians from Oslo
University of Oslo alumni
21st-century Norwegian politicians
20th-century Norwegian politicians
LGBT legislators
LGBT conservatism